Ji Dong-won (Hanja: 池東沅,  or  ; born 28 May 1991) is a South Korean professional footballer who plays as a forward for K League 1 club FC Seoul.

Early life
Born in Chuja Islands, an archipelago of Jeju City, Ji began his football career at Gwangyang Jecheol High School. (Jeonnam Dragons under-18 team). One of the best prospects in South Korea, Ji was sent to an English club Reading in 2007 by the Korea Football Association. After a brief spell in Reading Academy, Ji moved back to his home country to rejoin Jeonnam Dragons' youth team, where he started his career. It was announced in November 2009 that Ji was promoted to the first team of Jeonnam Dragons.

Club career

Jeonnam Dragons
Ji scored 13 goals during 29 appearances in his first professional season including a hat-trick against Gyeongnam in the 2010 Korean FA Cup. He became a national player due to his notable performance, although he conceded the K League Young Player of the Year award to his rival Yoon Bit-garam. The next year, Ji agreed a move to Premier League side Sunderland in the summer transfer window.

Sunderland
In June 2011, Ji agreed a deal to join Sunderland of the English Premier League as a summer transfer after impressing manager Steve Bruce with his performance in the 2011 Asian Cup, in which he scored four goals and provided two assists in six games. He signed a three-year deal for an undisclosed fee (believed to be around £2 million). Upon joining the club, Ji was given a number 17 shirt ahead of the new season.

Ji made his first appearance for his new club in a 1–1 draw with Arminia Bielefeld in the club's pre-season tour of Germany. He scored his first goal for Sunderland in a pre-season friendly against Darlington. Ji made his league debut for Sunderland on 13 August 2011 coming on for Asamoah Gyan in the 66th minute against Liverpool. Ji scored his first Premier League goal in the 90th minute against Chelsea from a Nicklas Bendtner assist on 10 September 2011, to which Sunderland lost 2–1. Just 12 minutes after coming on as substitute in the second–half against Manchester City on 1 January 2012, Ji scored the winning goal in the 90th minute, in a 1–0 win. However, his first team opportunities at Sunderland was limited, due to his fitness and he appeared invariably as a late substitute. As a result, he played in the reserve side to regain his match fitness. Towards end of the 2011–12 season, Ji's first team opportunities was further limited by new Manager Martin O'Neill. Despite this, Ji went on to make the total of 21 appearances and scoring 2 times in all competitions.

Ahead of the 2012–13 season, Ji was told by Manager O’Neill that he needs to develop in the Premier League physically if he is fully deliver on his potential. However, he failed to appear in the first team throughout the first half of the season and appeared in the reserve side instead.

In the 2013–14 season, Ji made his first Sunderland appearance in over a year, where he came on as a second-half substitute, in a 1–0 loss against Fulham in the opening game of the season. He appeared in the first team under the management of Paolo Di Canio and rejected a £5 million bid from an unnamed club for him. However, after Di Canio, Ji was hardly featured in the first team following a new management of Gus Poyet. On 1 January 2014, when he made his first start, in his first appearance under Poyet, in a 1–0 loss against Aston Villa, in what turns out to be his last appearance. Although he went on to make the total of seven appearances by the time of his departure, it was revealed that Sunderland failed gain international clearance from the German Football Association, resulting a fine by the Premier League.

During his time at Sunderland, Ji earned a cult hero status among the club's supporters.

Loan to FC Augsburg 
When his opportunities in Sunderland were limited, Ji was linked with Jeonnam Dragons and FC Augsburg. On 1 January 2013, Ji signed for FC Augsburg on loan for the rest of the season, where his national teammate midfielder Koo Ja-cheol was also on loan.

On 20 January 2013, Ji made his Augsburg debut against Fortuna Düsseldorf. On 24 February, he scored his first goal for Augsburg in a 2–1 win over 1899 Hoffenheim. On 14 April, Ji scored two goals against Eintracht Frankfurt, single-handedly clinching a 2–0 victory for his side. Afterwards, he also scored in two victories against VfB Stuttgart and Greuther Fürth, helping Augsburg avoid relegation. The club remained interested in signing Ji at the end of the season on a permanent basis, but failed to reach the deadline of purchase option.

On 17 January 2014, Sunderland announced that Ji had signed a contract with FC Augsburg on a permanent switch for an undisclosed fee until the end of the 2013–14 Bundesliga season and would sign for Borussia Dortmund on 1 July 2014.

On 25 January 2014, Ji started his second spell with FC Augsburg in style against his future employer Borussia Dortmund; after being substituted into the game with 20 minutes left to play, Ji scored a header to draw the game 2–2. Since making his debut for the club, Ji continued to remain in the first team for the rest of the season, even though he suffered injuries later on.

Borussia Dortmund
Ji signed a four-year contract with Borussia Dortmund on 1 July 2014 after finishing his loan spell with Augsburg. However, he only made appearances with the reserve team, prompting a return to Augsburg. This also combined with injuries as well. Prior his move to Augsburg, Ji found the six months spell at with injuries and playing in the reserve side, as "difficult" there.

Return to FC Augsburg

On 22 December 2014, after failing to appear competitively for Borussia Dortmund, Ji signed a three-and-a-half-year contract with FC Augsburg, until 30 June 2018.

On 5 November 2015, Ji scored his first Europa League goal in a 4–1 win over AZ. During the 2015–16 season, however, he struggled to regain his form due to his repetitive injuries and failed to score in the Bundesliga.

In the 2016–17 season, Ji started the season well when he was a given a handful of first team appearances for the side and found himself competing in the attacking midfield position with Takashi Usami, Caiuby and Jonathan Schmid. He then scored his first goal of the season, in a 2–1 loss against RB Leipzig on 30 September 2016. The following month, on 26 October 2016, he scored again in a 3–1 loss against Bayern Munich in the second round of the DFB–Pokal. By the end of 2016, Ji added two more goals against Eintracht Frankfurt and Borussia Dortmund. As the 2016–17 season progressed, Ji began playing into a forward role following the absent of Alfreð Finnbogason and Raúl Bobadilla but struggled to score under the new position. Despite this, Ji played all 34 matches in the 2016–17 Bundesliga.

On 1 March 2019, Ji scored twice against his former club Borussia Dortmund and led Augsburg to a stunning 2–1 upset over the league leaders.

FC Seoul
After a long spell in Augsburg, Ji moved to Mainz 05 and Eintracht Braunschweig, but wasn't impressive in both clubs. On 7 July 2021, it was announced that Ji would join FC Seoul.

International career
After representing the under-20 side, Ji was called up for the under-23 team prior to the 2010 Asian Games. During the bronze medal match against Iran, he scored dramatic equaliser and winning goal in the 88th and 89th minute respectively, bringing a 4–3 victory and a medal.

Ji was called up to the senior team ahead of the 2011 AFC Asian Cup. He made his senior debut and scored in a 1–0 win over Syria on 30 December 2010. He was selected for the Asian Cup team after showing his worth in the friendly. He scored two goals in a group match against India. Ji then scored twice for the second time in the third place match against Uzbekistan, earning a bronze medal. During the tournament, Ji scored four goals in six games, catching Sunderland manager Steve Bruce's eye.

Two years later, Ji participated in the 2012 Summer Olympics. He was a substitute until the end of the group stage, but appeared as a starter in the quarter-finals against Great Britain. He scored the opening goal against Great Britain, remunerating his manager Hong Myung-bo for believing him. He won a bronze medal after his team defeated Japan in the bronze medal match.

Ji played in the 2014 FIFA World Cup as a substitute. He made two appearances against Algeria and Belgium in the group stage.

Personal life
Ji is nicknamed the "Tuna", because his name was the same as Dongwon Industries, a company famous for canned tuna in South Korea.

In June 2017, Ji married Kang Ji-eun, an older sister of Kang Ji-young, a former member of K-pop girl group Kara. The couple first met in 2015.

Career statistics

Club

International

Scores and results list South Korea's goal tally first, score column indicates score after each Ji goal.

Honours
South Korea U23
 Summer Olympics bronze medal: 2012
 Asian Games bronze medal: 2010

South Korea
AFC Asian Cup third place: 2011

Individual
Korean FA Cup top goalscorer: 2010

References

External links

 
 Ji Dong-won – National Team Stats at KFA 
 
 

1991 births
Living people
Association football forwards
South Korean footballers
South Korean expatriate footballers
South Korea under-20 international footballers
South Korea under-23 international footballers
South Korea international footballers
Jeonnam Dragons players
Sunderland A.F.C. players
FC Augsburg players
Borussia Dortmund II players
Borussia Dortmund players
SV Darmstadt 98 players
1. FSV Mainz 05 players
Eintracht Braunschweig players
FC Seoul players
K League 1 players
Premier League players
Bundesliga players
2. Bundesliga players
3. Liga players
Expatriate footballers in England
South Korean expatriate sportspeople in England
South Korean expatriate sportspeople in the United Kingdom
Expatriate footballers in Germany
South Korean expatriate sportspeople in Germany
2011 AFC Asian Cup players
Footballers at the 2012 Summer Olympics
Olympic footballers of South Korea
Olympic medalists in football
Olympic bronze medalists for South Korea
Sportspeople from Jeju Province
Medalists at the 2012 Summer Olympics
2014 FIFA World Cup players
Asian Games medalists in football
Footballers at the 2010 Asian Games
Asian Games bronze medalists for South Korea
Medalists at the 2010 Asian Games
2019 AFC Asian Cup players